Elizabeth Rowray is an American politician serving as a member of the Indiana House of Representatives from the 35th district. She assumed office on November 4, 2020.

Early life and education 
Born and raised in Delaware County, Indiana, Rowray graduated from Muncie Burris High School. She earned a Bachelor of Arts degree in English from Ball State University.

Career 
Rowray served as the legislative director for Congressman Mark Souder. She later worked for the Muncie-Delaware County Economic Development Alliance. Rowray was elected to the Indiana House of Representatives in November 2020, defeating incumbent Democrat Melanie Wright. She is also a consultant in the non-profit sector.

References 

Living people
People from Delaware County, Indiana
People from Yorktown, Indiana
Ball State University alumni
Republican Party members of the Indiana House of Representatives
Women state legislators in Indiana
Year of birth missing (living people)
21st-century American women